John Mais (January 17, 1888 – August 8, 1974) was an American gymnast who competed in the 1920 Summer Olympics and in the 1924 Summer Olympics. He was born in Philadelphia.

References

1888 births
1974 deaths
Gymnasts from Philadelphia
American male artistic gymnasts
Olympic gymnasts of the United States
Gymnasts at the 1920 Summer Olympics
Gymnasts at the 1924 Summer Olympics